Galarreta is a village in San Millán/Donemiliaga municipality in Álava, Basque Country, Spain. 

Populated places in Álava